Jean-Pierre Esteva (14 September 1880 – 11 January 1951) was a French naval officer who served in the First and Second World Wars. From 1940 to 1943, he served as Resident-General in Tunisia for the Vichy French government.

Naval career

As a Lieutenant, he participated in the First World War. Assigned to the Mediterranean squadron, he took part, among other operations, in the Battle of the Dardanelles on the occasion of which he particularly distinguished himself.

Promoted Rear Admiral in 1929, he was Director of Maritime Aviation, then Deputy Chief of the Air Staff in 1930 before becoming Vice Admiral in 1935. He left for the Far East where he was commander-in-chief of the naval forces. He commanded several naval units where he hoisted his flag aboard the light cruiser . His stay in the Pacific led him to regularly visit the British bases of Hong Kong and Singapore as well as to fully appreciate the rise in power of the Imperial Japanese Navy. On his return to Metropolitan France, his versatility and his skills made him the ideal to occupy the function of inspector of the maritime forces. Subsequently, in 1939, he took command of the French naval forces in the South.

Vichy
After the armistice of June 1940, Esteva, like many other admirals including François Darlan, chose to serve the Vichy regime. A trusted man of Marshal Pétain, he left for French North Africa. On 26 July 1940, he became Resident General of France in Tunisia. In this position, he succeeded Marcel Peyrouton, who had been appointed to ministerial functions in Vichy. In November 1942, when the Allies launched Operation Torch, Esteva was still stationed there. In response, he procrastinated, and ended by collaboration with the Axis. On 9 November 1942, he condemned the arrival of Luftwaffe aircraft at El Aouina airfield. But very quickly, out of loyalty to Pétain and under pressure from Pierre Laval, Esteva changed position. He allowed the Germans to take over several French bases in Tunisia, with intact fuel stocks. In the process, he neutralized Admiral Derrien, who had encouraged his troops to fight against the Axis.

In May 1943, as Allied troops occupied Tunisia, Esteva was repatriated to France by the Germans. The admiral was evacuated on 7 May by plane and at the same time as the consul general of the Third Reich in Tunisia. In Paris, he was taken to the Ritz (then partly occupied by the Luftwaffe) in order to be put there under house arrest while waiting for the German authorities to rule on his fate. Locked in his room, he was guarded by German sentries. Finally released on 18 May, he arrived at Vichy where he was warmly welcomed and congratulated by Pétain for his loyalty to the orders received. German Foreign Minister Joachim von Ribbentrop sent him a message of sympathy and thanked him for having "facilitated the conduct of the war by the Axis powers". Esteva said at his trial before the high court: "This letter doesn't interest me. I am a French civil servant. I had nothing to do with von Ribbentrop."

In North Africa, however, a War Council, chaired by General Henri Giraud, on 15 May sentenced Esteva to the death penalty in absentia.

Arrest and trial
On 22 September 1944, he was arrested by French police in Paris and then imprisoned in Clairvaux Prison. A new trial is organized. Accused of delivering wheat to the Italian army in Libya, granted facilities to Axis troops to establish themselves on the coast and Tunisian airfields after the Allied landing in 1942, recruited workers and combatants in a Phalanx African in the service of Germany, manifested on several occasions his sympathy for the German cause, he sketches the so-called "double play" defense, often repeated later. Thus, he affirms that in spite of his fidelity to Pétain, it was not a blind discipline which guided him, that he only composed with the enemy to save the essential: his departure would have put Tunisia under Italian control, the delivery of wheat to the Italians in Libya was compensated by identical shipments to the French populations, he sabotaged the recruitment of the African Phalanx, he did not have enough troops, with 12,000 men, to oppose the Axis forces, the Allies being too far away. Admiral Muselier testified in his favor during this trial. He was nonetheless found guilty of treason on 15 March 1945. Militarily degraded by the High Court of Justice, he was sentenced to forced labor for life. Claude Morgan, resistant communist founder of the French Letters, takes this punishment to witness, in an article entitled "The smallpox", to denounce the indulgence of justice, which did not condemn him to death, and the complicity which would benefit Vichy, saying: "If Esteva is not a traitor, it is because there is no traitor."

Sick, Esteva was pardoned on 11 August 1950. He died a few months later and was interred in Reims.

Leaning, in The Great Trials of Collaboration, on Esteva's journey, and in particular his Tunisian period and his trial, Roger Maudhuy considers, on the basis of several testimonies, that Esteva helped the local Resistance and provided false identity documents to members of the Jewish community, communist activists, German escapees and Alsatian refugees.

General de Gaulle, in his War Memories, commented on this trial in these terms: 
"Admiral Esteva was sentenced to imprisonment. At the end of a career which, until these events, had been exemplary, this old sailor, led astray by false discipline, found himself an accomplice, then a victim, of a harmful enterprise." For his part, Pierre Messmer said to Roger Maudhuy: " What do you want? The High Court could not begin with an acquittal. Esteva did not deserve such a fate, I agree. Two or three years later, he would no doubt have been acquitted. But it was war ... Pétain, Laval, all those responsible, the big ones, were out of reach. He was there. He was unlucky, that's all".

He was decorated with the Order of the Francisque.

Citations

Bibliography
 

Roger Maudhuy, Les grands procès de la Collaboration, Saint-Paul (Haute-Vienne), L. Souny, 2009.
 Serge La Barbera, Les Français de Tunisie – 1930-1950 (troisième partie sur le régime de Vichy), L'Harmattan, 2006, p. 405 .
 André Figueras, Onze amiraux dans l'ouragan de l'histoire, Paris, André Figueras, 1991.
Georges London, L'Amiral Esteva et le général Dentz devant la Haute Cour de Justice, Lyon, R. Bonnefon, 1945.

1880 births
1951 deaths
French military personnel of World War I
French Navy admirals of World War II
French prisoners sentenced to life imprisonment
French collaborators with Nazi Germany
Prisoners sentenced to life imprisonment by France
People convicted of treason against France